Sehnsucht 202 (English title: Longing 202) is a 1932 German musical comedy film directed by Max Neufeld and distributed by UFA. Sehnsucht 202 was Luise Rainer's film debut.

Plot
Set in Vienna, the film focuses on Magda and Kitty, two young women who reply to a newspaper advertisement and are contacted by the two young owners of a parfume store. Because their replies were confused with that of a flirtatious stenographer, the two men have different intentions than the girls and complications ensue.

Cast
Magda Schneider as Magda
Luise Rainer as Kitty
Fritz Schulz as Bobby
Paul Kemp as Silber
Rolf von Goth as Harry
Attila Hörbiger as Paul, Magda's brother
Mizzi Griebl as Magda's mother
Hans Thimig as Beamter

Reception
The film was received generally well. The New York Times praised Magda Schneider, calling her "impersonally pleasing as ever". The reviewer furthermore said: "Fritz Schulz did not let a comedy point get by and the cast was rounded smoothly by Rolf van Goth and Paul Kemp. Richard Fall has composed a song, "Mein Schatz, ich bin in Dein Parfüm verliebt" ("Sweetheart, I'm in Love With Your Perfume"), which will have a bad break if it remains within Central European dance orchestra borders. I have spent many worse two hours with camera and microphone."

Because of the film's success, two alternate versions were made and released shortly later:  (1932), a French version, and Milyon avcilari (1934), a Turkish version.

References

External links 
 

1932 films
Austrian musical comedy films
German musical comedy films
1932 musical comedy films
Austrian black-and-white films
German black-and-white films
Films of the Weimar Republic
Films directed by Max Neufeld
Films set in Vienna
German multilingual films
1932 multilingual films
1930s German films